Tecno Fes Vol. 2 (labeled as just Tecno Fes on the spine) is an extended play by Italian DJ Gigi D'Agostino. It was released on Zyx Records in 2000.

Track listing
Composed by D'Agostino, Jacno, Montagner, and Sandrini. Performed by D'Agostino and Rectangle.

 "Amorelettronico" – 7:19
 "La Passion" – 6:44 (medley with Rectangle) 
 "Un Giorno Credi" – 5:59
 "Souvenir" – 8:00
 "You Spin Me Round (Like a Record)" – 4:16
 "Le Serpent" – 4:48
 "Cada Vez" – 7:26  (only available in some countries)
 "L'Amour Toujours" – 6:25
 "Sottosopra" – 3:55
 "Baci & Abbracci" – 4:49
 "Tecno Fes" – 4:34
 "Tanzen" – 3:37
 "La Passion" – 6:00 (medley with Rectangle)

Charts

Weekly charts

Year-end charts

References

External links

2000 albums
Gigi D'Agostino albums